The Late Glacial Interstadial (LGI) c. 14,670 to c. 12,890 BP, also called the Bølling–Allerød interstadial, represents the first pronounced warming since the end of the Last Glacial Maximum (LGM). Human populations, which had previously been forced into refuge areas, gradually begin to repopulate the Northern Hemisphere's Eurasian landmass. 

Evidence for its occurrence stems from two main types of analysis. The first is the use of oxygen isotope stages (OIS) gathered from stratified deep-sea sediment cores. Samples are gathered and measured for change in isotope levels to determine temperature fluctuation for given periods of time. The second is a proxy measurement, the observation of certain reappearing fauna and flora fossils that can survive only in temperate climates, thus indicating warming trends for a given geographic area.

Archaeological evidence of settlement and resettlement in certain areas by humans also serves as proxy measurements. Towards the end of OIS 2 in which the Last Glacial Maximum occurs, the deep-sea sediment cores indicate a gradually warming climate, and the reappearance of certain warm-weather flora and fauna remains throughout the Northern Hemisphere correlate with that trend. The Late Glacial Interstadial was followed by a severe decline in temperatures during the Younger Dryas from c. 12,890 to c. 11,650 BP.

Western Europe and the North European Plain
The climate began to improve rapidly throughout Western Europe and the North European Plain c. 16,000-15,000 years ago. The environmental landscape became increasingly boreal, except in the far north, where conditions remained arctic. Sites of human occupation reappeared in northern France, Belgium, northwest Germany, and southern Britain between 15,500 and 14,000 years ago. Many of these sites are classified as Magdalenian, though other industries containing distinctive curved back and tanged points appeared as well. As the Fennoscandian ice sheet continued to shrink, plants and people began to repopulate the freshly deglaciated areas of southern Scandinavia.

Between 12,000 and 10,000 years ago, the western coast of Norway and southern Sweden to latitude 65° north became occupied by sites belonging to the Fosna-Hensbacka complex. They are defined by the appearance of tanged points and other artifacts similar to those found earlier in Northwest Germany. Komsa sites, dated to about 7,000 years ago, are found along Norway's Finnmark county above 70° north and further east on the Kola Peninsula. They are defined by surface finds of tanged points, burins, scrapers, and adzes. The primary game of Magdalenian hunters appears to have been reindeer, though evidence of bird and shellfish consumption persist, as well.

East European Plain
Periglacial loess-steppe environments prevailed across the East European Plain, but climates improved slightly during several brief interstadials and began to warm significantly after the beginning of the Late Glacial Maximum. Pollen profiles for this time indicate a pine-birch woodland interspersed with the steppe in the deglaciated northern plain, birch-pine forest with some broadleaf trees in the central region, and steppe in the south. The pattern reflects the reemergence of a marked zonation of biomes with the decline of glacial conditions. Human site occupation density was most prevalent in the Crimea region and increased as early as around 16,000 years ago.

Reoccupation of northern territories of the East European Plain did not occur until 13,000 years ago. Settlement of the central portion of the East European Plain had significantly reduced during a period of maximum cold around 21,000 to 17,000 years ago.

Overall, little archaeological evidence suggests major shifting settlement pattern during this time on the East European plain. That is unlike what was occurring in Western Europe, where Magdalenian industry producers were rapidly repopulating much of Europe. Evidence of this can be found as far east at Kunda sites (about 10,000 years ago, throughout the Baltics, where tanged point and other tool making traditions reminiscent of the northwestern European Magdalenian persist).

Generally, lithic technology is dominated by blade production and typical Upper Paleolithic tool forms such as burins and backed blades (the most persistent). Kostenki archaeological sites of multiple occupation layers persist from the Last Glacial Maximum and into the Late Glacial Maximum on the eastern edge of the Central Russian Upland, along the Don River. Epigravettian archaeological sites, similar to Eastern Gravettian sites, are common in the southwest, central, and southern regions of the East European Plain about 17,000 to 10,000 years BP and are also present in the Crimea and Northern Caucasus.

The time of the Epigravettian also reveals evidence for tailored clothing production, a tradition persisting from preceding Upper Paleolithic archaeological horizons. Fur-bearing small mammal remains abound such as Arctic fox and paw bones of hares, reflecting pelt removal. Large and diverse inventories of bone, antler, and ivory implements are common, and ornamentation and art are associated with all major industries. Insights into the technology of the time can also be seen in features such as structures, pits, and hearths mapped on open-air occupation areas scattered across the East European Plain.

Mammoths were typically hunted for fur, bone shelter, and bone fuel. In the southwest region around the middle Dnestr Valley, sites are dominated by reindeer and horse, accounting for 80 to 90% of the identifiable large mammal remains. Mammoth is less common, typically 15% or less, as the availability of wood eliminated the need for heavy consumption of bone fuel and collection of large bones for construction. Mammoth remains may have been collected for other raw material, namely ivory. Other large mammals in modest numbers include steppe bison and red deer.

Plant foods more likely played an increasing role in the southwest region than in the central and southern plains since southwest sites consistently yield grinding stones widely thought to have been used for preparation of seeds, roots, and other plant parts.

Siberian Plain
Southern Siberia supported little vegetation, but some trees, mainly pine, persisted. Evidence comes not only from pollen-spore data but also from wood charcoal in former hearths at archaeological sites. Pollen samples around Chukotka and the Taimyr Peninsula indicate a forest zone emerging roughly 7000 years ago and slightly warmer climates than now.

The earliest human reoccupation of Siberia did not begin until 21,000 years ago. Evidence continues to be found mainly in the south around Lake Baikal, as at the Studenoe site, for example. Later sites include Kokorevo in the Yenisei Valley and Chernoozer'e in the Ob River basin. The sites are confined to latitudes below 57°N and most are C14 dated from 19,000 to 14,000 years ago. Settlements differed from those of the East European Plain as they reflected a more mobile lifestyle by the absence of mammoth-bone houses and storage pits, all indicators of long-term settlement. Visual art was uncommon. Fauna remained red deer, reindeer, and moose and indicate a mainly meat-oriented diet.

The habitat of Siberia was far harsher  than anywhere else and often did not provide enough survival opportunities for its human inhabitants. That is what forced human groups to remain dispersed and mobile, as is reflected in the lithic technology, as tiny blades were typically manufactured, often termed microblades less than 8 mm wide with unusually sharp edges indicating frugality from low resource levels. They were fixed into grooves along one or both edges of a sharpened bone or antler point. Specimens of complete microblade-inset points have been recovered from both Kokorevo and Chernoozer'e. At Kokorevo, one was found embedded in a bison shoulder blade.

As climates warmed further around 15,000 years, fish began to populate rivers, and technology used to harvest them, such as barbed harpoons, first appeared on the Upper Angara River. People expanded northwards into the Middle Lena Basin. By 11,000 years ago, settlement size increased as discovered at the Ust'-Belaya site, where fauna remains consisted of entirely modern-type remains of deer, moose, fish, and traces of domesticated dogs. New technology such as fish hooks appear among bone and antler implements.

The Dyuktai culture, near Dyuktai Cave, on the Aldan River at 59°N, is similar to southern Siberian sites and includes the wedge-shaped cores and microblades, along with some bifacial tools, burins, and scrapers. The site likely represents the material remains of the people who spread across the Bering Land Bridge and into the New World. Around 12,000 years ago, the Sumnagin culture appears over large portions of northern and eastern Siberia. The sites are small and yield few artifacts of small blades struck off thin cylindrical cores. Bone tools and fishing equipment are absent.

Most Sumnagin sites were located in the forest zone so most tools were likely created from wood, which would help explain a sparse archaeological record. Another factor may be low levels of human settlement since the region of the Sumnagin culture could likely support a considerably lower biomass than the rest of Eurasia. That is still  true along the Middle Lena Basin among current human populations. The Sumnagin diet consisted of large mammals such as deer, moose, and even brown bear, as revealed by the fauna remains found. Nevertheless, Sumnagin culture representatives moved northward and became the first to populate Siberia's Arctic tundra around 10,000 years ago.

At around 9500 to 9000 years ago, Sumnagin sites spread to Zhokhov Island, where slotted bone and antler points, antler and ivory mattocks, and bone handles for cutting tools were found. Few wooden artifacts were also found, including a large shovel or scoop, arrow shafts, and a sledge-runner fragment. Fauna remains consist of reindeer and polar bear. Only isolated bones of walrus, seal, and birds were identified. Further settlement proceeded eastward and westward into Chukotka and the Taimyr Peninsula.

North America

Over the land between the Lena Basin and northwest Canada, increased aridity occurred during the Last Glacial Maximum. Sea level fell to about 120 m below its present position, exposing a dry plain between Chukotka and western Alaska. Clear skies reduced precipitation, and loess deposition promoted well-drained, nutrient-rich soils that supported diverse steppic plant communities and herds of large grazing mammals. The wet tundra soils and spruce bogs that exist today were absent.

Cold temperatures and massive ice sheets covered most of Canada and the northwest coast, thus preventing human colonization of North America prior to 16,000 years ago. An "ice-free corridor" through western Canada to the northern plains is thought to have opened up no earlier than 13,500 years ago. However, deglaciation in the Pacific northwest may have taken place more rapidly and a coastal route could have been available by 17,000 years ago. Rising temperatures and increased moisture accelerated environmental change after 14,000 years ago, as shrub tundra replaced dry steppe in many parts of Beringia.

Camp settlement sites are found along Tanana River in central Alaska by 14,000 years ago and some evidence suggests human exploration at the Bluefish Caves in the Yukon as early as 15,500 years ago. Earliest occupation levels at the Tanana Valley sites contain artifacts similar to the Siberian Dyuktai culture. At Swan Point, these comprise microblades, burins, and flakes struck from bifacial tools. Artifacts at the nearby site of Broken Mammoth are few, but include several rods of mammoth ivory. The diet was of large mammals and birds, as indicated by faunal remains.

Earliest site occupation at Ushki sites of central Kamchatka (about 13,000 years ago) display evidence of small oval houses and bifacial points. Stone pendants, beads, and a burial pit are present. In central Alaska up the northern foothills at the Dry Creek site c. 13,500-13,000 years ago near Nenana Valley, small bifacial points were found. People were thought to have moved into this area to hunt elk and sheep on a seasonal basis. Microblade sites typologically similar to Dyuktai appear about 13,000 years ago in central Kamchatka and throughout many parts of Alaska.

Around 12,000 years ago, the rising sea level reached a position less than 60 m below today's level and flooded the lowlands between Chukotka and western Alaska. The ensuing increase in moisture accelerated Alaska's transition to wet tundra and coniferous forests. The Bering Land Bridge had closed, thus Beringia ceased to exist. About this time, sites that comprise the Denali complex appeared and persisted to about 7,500 years ago. Denali complex sites indicate high yields of caribou remains c. 8,000 years ago and corresponds with an increase in settlement size.

Human genetics

The European distribution of Y-chromosome haplogroup I and various associated subclades has also been explained as resulting from male postglacial recolonization of Europe from refuge in the Balkans, Iberia, and the Ukraine/Central Russian Plain.

Males possessing haplogroup Q are postulated as representing a significant portion of the population who crossed Beringia and populated North America for the first time.

The distribution of mtDNA haplogroup H has been postulated as representing the major female repopulating of Europe after the Last Glacial Maximum from the Franco-Cantabrian region.  mtDNA haplogroups A, B, C, D and X are interpreted according to some as supporting a single pre-Clovis populating of the Americas via a coastal route.

Oceans
The deep oceans were depleted in radiocarbon during the deglaciation following the LGM, which has been hypothesised to be the result of sluggish meridional overturning circulation but was more likely due to a release of volcanic carbon or methane clathrates into abyssal waters.

The Eastern Tropical Pacific Oxygen Minimum Zone (ETP-OMZ) witnessed high oxygen depletion during the early stages of the deglaciation following the LGM, most likely as a result of a weakened Atlantic meridional overturning circulation (AMOC) and an increased influx of nutrient-rich waters due to intensified upwelling.

See also
Last Glacial Maximum refugia
Doggerland (North Sea)
Mammoth steppe
Sundaland (SE Asia)
Sahul (Australia/New Guinea)

References

Modern human genetic history
Last Glacial Period